Home from the Vinyl Cafe (1998) is Stuart McLean's second volume of stories that first aired on the CBC Radio program The Vinyl Cafe. It was the winner of the 1999 Stephen Leacock Award for Humour.

Stories included in Home from the Vinyl Cafe:
Dave Cooks the Turkey
Holland
Valentine's Day
Sourdough
Music Lessons
Burd
Emil
The Birthday Party
Summer Camp
The Cottage
Road Trip
Labour Days
School Days
A Day Off
On the Roof
Polly Anderson's Christmas Party

See also
List of Dave and Morley stories

References

External links
Stuart McLean profile at cbc.ca
The Vinyl Cafe website

1998 short story collections
Short story collections by Stuart McLean